Metodi may refer to:

2609 Kiril-Metodi, main belt asteroid with an orbital period of 1209
Metodi Deyanov (born 1975), former midfielder
Metodi Shatorov (1897–1944), Bulgarian politician and leader of the Macedonian communists